Malik Dadashov (7 June 1924 — 2 December 1996) was an Azerbaijani actor and People's Artist of the Azerbaijan SSR.

Biography
Malik Dadashov was born on June 7, 1924 in Baku. His first education was in the field of medicine. He left his first education uncompleted for the Great Patriotic War. Due to the contusion he received in 1943, he was returned and was treated for a long time. After treatment he had worked as a musician in military units. After returning from the war in 1945, Malik Dadashov went to Azerbaijan State Theatre of Young Spectators and was hired as an actor there. Then he was graduated from Theatrical Institute named after Mirzaagha Aliyev in 1950. M.Dadashov started to work at Azerbaijan State Academic National Drama Theatre after graduated. At that time on the stage of Azerbaijani theatre Alasgar Alakbarov, Mehdi Mammadov, Adil Isgandarov and other corifeys worked.

His arrival on the stage coincided with 1946. Started his performances in a newly opened theater in Zaqatala. The 23-year-old actor played a leading role in the Zaqatala theater, and the main female characters played by a young actress named Sofia Huseynova. Rafael Dadashov was born from this marriage in 1946. Melik Dadashov had two more marriages. He had a son and 3 daughters.

His first role in the film is in "Leyli and Majnun" by Latif Safarov based on Anvar Mammadkhanli's script in 1961. His most famous role is Gamlo in "The Last Pass" movie. In 1985, Malik Dadashov starred in the film "The Interviewer", co-produced by Azerbaijanfilm and Belarusfilm. In the film about Anatoli Kawaleznik, who was poisoned in Pakistan for political reasons, Malik Dadashov creates the image of Niaz Khan, the country's counter-intelligence commissioner.

M.Dadashov was awarded the title of People's Artist of the Azerbaijan SSR in 1974.

The actor died on December 2, 1996 in Baku.

Family
Malik Dadashov was brother of Salman Dadashov, father of Rafael Dadashov. He is also Hokuma Najafova's sister's son and uncle of Brilliant Dadashova.

Filmography

References

Azerbaijani actors
Soviet people
1924 births
1996 deaths
Burials at II Alley of Honor